The 2009–10 season was the 99th season in Hajduk Split’s history and their nineteenth in the Prva HNL. Their 2nd place finish in the 2008–09 season meant it was their 19th successive season playing in the Prva HNL.

First-team squad

Competitions

Overall record

Prva HNL

Classification

Results summary

Results by round

Results by opponent

Source: 2009–10 Croatian First Football League article

Matches

Friendlies

Pre-season

Trokut turnir (18 July)

On-season

Mid-season

Prva HNL

Source: HRnogomet.com

Croatian Football Cup

Source: HRnogomet.com

Europa League

Third qualifying round 

Source: uefa.com

Player seasonal records
Competitive matches only. Updated to games played 13 May 2010.

Top scorers

Source: Competitive matches

Appearances and goals

|-

|}

See also
2009–10 Croatian First Football League
2009–10 Croatian Football Cup

References

External sources
 2009–10 Prva HNL at HRnogomet.com
 2009–10 Croatian Cup at HRnogomet.com
 2009–10 UEFA Europa League at rsssf.com

HNK Hajduk Split seasons
Hajduk Split